"Like a River Runs" is a song by American indie pop act Bleachers, originally appearing on their 2014 album Strange Desire. It was released as a 7-inch disc on June 23, 2014. It was also released to Alternative and Triple A radio on April 27, 2015. In 2015, Bleachers released an EP of the same name, which includes four tracks: a fifteen-minute spoken word track called "Dreams Aren't Random", two alternate versions of the title track performed by the band, and a cover version performed by Sia.

Track listing
 "Like a River Runs (Jack's 2015 Rework)"
 "Like a River Runs" (performed by Sia)
 "Like a River Runs (Live from Buffalo)"
 "Dreams Aren't Random"

Charts

References

 

2014 songs
Bleachers (band) songs
Sia (musician) songs
Songs written by Jack Antonoff
Songs written by John Hill (record producer)